The Speed Girl is a lost 1921 American silent comedy film produced by Realart Pictures and released through Paramount Pictures. It was directed by Maurice Campbell, a Broadway director and producer, and starred Bebe Daniels, then a popular 20-year-old veteran film actress.

The film was supposedly expanded into a screenplay from Bebe Daniels's real life jail sentence of 10 days for speeding.

Plot
As described in a film magazine, screen star Betty Lee is in love with naval officer Tom Manley. Tom is due back on his ship at a certain hour and Betty, not realizing the importance of this, sets his watch back. When she is told that he will be court-martialed if he is not on deck on time, Betty endeavors to get him back in town. She is arrested for speeding and put in a jail cell. Hundreds of fans visit, and Judge Ketcham (Courtright), who had sentenced her, brings a bouquet and apologizes. Betty befriends a fellow prisoner and is instrumental in helping her, too.

Cast
Bebe Daniels as Betty Lee
Theodore von Eltz as Tom Manley
Frank Elliott as Carl D'Arcy
Walter Hiers as Soapy Taylor
Norris Johnson as Hilda
Truly Shattuck as Mrs. Lee
William Courtright as Judge Ketcham
Barbara Maier as Little Girl

References

External links

Lantern slide for The Speed Girl
Lobby card at listal.com

American silent feature films
Lost American films
Paramount Pictures films
Films based on short fiction
1921 comedy films
Silent American comedy films
American black-and-white films
Films directed by Maurice Campbell
Lost comedy films
1921 lost films
1920s American films
1920s English-language films